Super Best Records: 15th Celebration (stylized as Super Best Records -15th Celebration-) is the second greatest hits album by Japanese singer Misia. It was released to commemorate Misia's 15th anniversary as a recording artist by Ariola Japan on February 20, 2013, one day shy of her actual 15th anniversary. The three-disc set was released in Blu-spec CD2 format and each disc was remastered by a different music engineer. The compilation includes four reworked tracks, the singles "Koi wa Owaranai Zutto", "Deepness" and "Back in Love Again", and the new song "Holiday", which was released as a promotional single for the album.

Background and release
After discussing the project with DJ Gomi, Misia first came up with the idea to spread the songs across three discs, each covering a different genre of song, namely uptempo, mid-tempo and ballad. The idea to ask different mastering engineers to produce each disc was also floated by during their discussion. Ultimately, Misia and her team decided on mixing genres to offer the listener a more balanced listening experience, but held on to the idea of tasking different engineers with a separate disc. In an interview with Natalie, Misia revealed that the song selection process took about three months to complete. The selected songs were assigned to each engineer based on their forte. Disc one, which mainly features bright and lively tracks, was remastered by Chris Gehringer, disc two, consisting mostly of ballads, was tasked to Herb Powers Jr., and the live instrument-focused disc three was handled by Tom Coyne.

In addition to the remastered songs, the compilation also includes reworked tracks. An updated version with new vocals, lowered a half-step, of Misia's debut single "Tsutsumikomu Yō ni...", produced by DJ Gomi and mixed by Goh Hotoda, kicks off disc one, which also features an EDM version of the single "Catch the Rainbow". Disc three includes two re-recorded tracks: "Into the Light" from The Glory Day EP, and "Ashita e".

The limited edition of the album comes with a DVD that details Misia's career progression through whiteboard animation and behind-the-scenes footage from music video shoots, concerts, and her charity work. Super Best Records: 15th Celebration was released simultaneously with The Tour of Misia Box Blu-ray: 15th Celebration, a Blu-ray box set of all ten concerts from The Tour of Misia series.

Commercial performance
Super Best Records: 15th Celebration entered the daily Oricon Albums Chart at number two, with 22,000 copies sold on its first day. Two days later, the album rose to the top of the chart and stayed there for the remainder of the week. It debuted at number one on the weekly Oricon Albums Chart, selling 65,000 units and becoming Misia's first number-one album in over eight years, the first since Misia Love & Ballads: The Best Ballade Collection. The album also topped the Billboard Japan Top Albums Sales chart on its debut week. It fell to number five on the Oricon chart the following week, logging sales of 31,000 copies. It held on to the top ten for a third and last week, charting at number 8 and selling 15,000 copies. As of February 2017, Super Best Records: 15th Celebration has charted for seventy-nine non-consecutive weeks on the Oricon Albums Chart, selling a reported total of 167,000 copies during its run.

Track listing

Charts

Certifications

See also
 List of Oricon number-one albums

References

External links
 Misia Super Best Records: 15th Celebration official site

2013 greatest hits albums
Misia compilation albums
Ariola Japan compilation albums
Albums produced by DJ Gomi
Albums produced by Shirō Sagisu